Prasonisi ("leek island"), is an uninhabited Greek islet, in the Libyan Sea, close to the southern coast of eastern Crete. Administratively it lies within the Lefki municipality of Lasithi.

See also
List of islands of Greece

Landforms of Lasithi
Uninhabited islands of Crete
Islands of Greece